The 1937–38 Montreal Maroons season was the 14th and last season of the Montreal Maroons. The team finished in last place in the Canadian Division. The team and franchise were dissolved after the season.

Offseason
On September 24, 1937, Tommy Gorman hired King Clancy from the Toronto Maple Leafs to take over as coach of the Maroons. Clancy had retired as a player partway through the previous season, and had been acting as a 'goodwill ambassador' for the Maple Leafs organization. The Leafs did not ask for any compensation.

Regular season
King Clancy's time as coach ended with his resignation on December 30, 1937. The Maroons were holding a 6–11–1 record. Gorman took over on an interim basis. The team  would be taken over by Tommy Gorman, who would lead them to a 6–19–5 record. The Maroons scored 101 goals (only good for 6th in the 8 team league), but allowed 149 goals (dead last) to finish dead last in their final season. The team would soon be dormant, as the backers tried to move the team to St. Louis. When that failed, the team tried to sell to a Philadelphia group, but failed due to the lack of a suitable arena. Len Peto failed to find a suitable arena by the end of the 1946–47 NHL season, as the team dissolved for good.

Final standings

Record vs. opponents

Game log

Player stats

Regular season
Scoring

Goaltending

Note: GP = Games played; G = Goals; A = Assists; Pts = Points; +/- = Plus/minus; PIM = Penalty minutes; PPG = Power-play goals; SHG = Short-handed goals; GWG = Game-winning goals
      MIN = Minutes played; W = Wins; L = Losses; T = Ties; GA = Goals against; GAA = Goals against average; SO = Shutouts;

Awards and records

See also
1937–38 NHL season

References

External links

Montreal Maroons seasons
Montreal Maroons
Montreal Maroons